Each winner of the 1977 Governor General's Awards for Literary Merit was selected by a panel of judges administered by the Canada Council for the Arts.

Winners

English Language
Fiction: Timothy Findley, The Wars.
Poetry or Drama: D. G. Jones, Under the Thunder the Flowers Light Up the Earth.
Non-Fiction: Frank Scott, Essays on the Constitution.

French Language
Fiction: Gabrielle Roy, Ces enfants de ma vie
Poetry or Drama: Michel Garneau, Les célébrations et Adidou Adidouce.
Non-Fiction: Denis Monière, Le développement des idéologies au Québec des origines à nos jours.

Governor General's Awards
Governor General's Awards
1977 literary awards